Gapan is a city in the Philippines.

Gapan may also refer to:
GAPAN, the Guild of Air Pilots and Air Navigators, now known as The Honourable Company of Air Pilots
 Kapan, (Armenian: Ղափան), formerly known as Ghapan, a town in Armenia